The 31st Canadian Parliament was a briefly lived parliament in session from October 9 until December 14, 1979.  The membership was set by the 1979 federal election on May 22, 1979, and it was dissolved after the minority government of Joe Clark failed to pass a Motion of Confidence on December 13, 1979. The dissolution of parliament led to the 1980 federal election.  Lasting only 66 days from first sitting to dissolution, and only nine months from election to election, the 31st was the shortest parliament in Canadian history.

The 31st Parliament was controlled by a Progressive Conservative Party minority led by Prime Minister Joe Clark and the 21st Canadian Ministry. The Official Opposition was the Liberal Party, led by former prime minister Pierre Trudeau.

The Speaker was James Jerome.  See also List of Canadian electoral districts 1976-1987 for a list of the ridings in this parliament.

There was only one session of the 31st Parliament:

Party standings

The party standings as of the election and as of dissolution were as follows:

Members of the House of Commons
Members of the House of Commons in the 31st parliament arranged by province.

Newfoundland

* Donald Jamieson resigned from parliament and was replaced by Roger Simmons in a September 19, 1979, by-election

Prince Edward Island

Nova Scotia

New Brunswick

Quebec

Ontario

Manitoba

Saskatchewan

*John Diefenbaker died on August 16, 1979; Stan Hovdebo won the following November 19th by-election to fill his seat

Alberta

British Columbia

Northern Territories

By-elections

References

Succession

 
Canadian parliaments
1979 establishments in Canada
1979 disestablishments in Canada
1979 in Canadian politics